Arsacius (before 324 – November 11, 405) was the intruding archbishop of Constantinople from 404 to 405, after the violent expulsion of John Chrysostom. His memory is kept on 11 October.

Biography
He was the brother of Nectarius, Chrysostom's predecessor, and had served as archpresbyter under Chrysostom. In earlier life his brother had selected him for the bishopric of Tarsus, and had attributed his refusal to an ambitious design of becoming his successor at Constantinople. On this, Palladius asserts, he swore voluntarily that he would never accept the see of Constantinople.

After he had passed his 80th year, the success of the intrigue of Aelia Eudoxia, queen of emperor Arcadius, and Theophilus, Patriarch of Alexandria, against Chrysostom opened an unexpected way for his elevation to the archiepiscopal throne. Eudoxia and the party now triumphant wanted for their new archbishop a facile tool, under whose authority they might shelter the violence of their proceedings. Such an instrument they had in Arsacius. Moreover, his hostility to Chrysostom had been sufficiently testified at the synod of the Oak, when he appeared as a witness against him and vehemently pressed his condemnation.

He was consecrated archbishop on June 27, 404. Chrysostom, on hearing of it, denounced him "as a spiritual adulterer, and a wolf in sheep's clothing". The diocese soon made it plain that they regarded the new archbishop as an intruder. With the exception of a few officials, the dependants of the court party, and the expectants of royal favour, the people of Constantinople refused to attend any religious assembly at which he might be expected to be present. Deserting the sacred edifices, they gathered in the outskirts of the city, and in the open air.

Arsacius appealed to the emperor Arcadius, by whose orders, or rather those of Eudoxia, soldiers were sent to disperse the suburban assemblies. Those who had taken a leading part in them were apprehended and tortured, and a fierce persecution commenced of the adherents of Chrysostom. We learn from Sozomenus, that Arsacius was not personally responsible for these cruel deeds; but he lacked strength of character to offer any decided opposition to the proceedings of his clergy. They did what they pleased, and Arsacius bore the blame.

Arsacius' position became intolerable. In vain all the bishops and clergy who, embracing Chrysostom's cause, had refused to recognize him were driven out of the East on November 18, 404. This only spread the evil more widely. The whole Western episcopate refused to acknowledge him, and Pope Innocent I, who had warmly espoused Chrysostom's interests, wrote to the clergy and laity of Constantinople strongly condemning the intrusion of Arsacius, and exhorting them to persevere in their adhesion to their true archbishop. It is no cause for surprise that Arsacius's episcopate was a brief one, and that a feeble character worn out by old age should have soon given way before a storm of opposition so universal.

He died November 11, 405.

References

Attribution

Chrysostom Ep. cxxv.
Palladius Dial. c.xi.;
Phot. C. 59;
Socrates Scholasticus H.E. vi. 19;
Sozomenus H. E. viii.23, 26;

4th-century births
405 deaths
Arsacius
Ancient Christians involved in controversies
4th-century Byzantine bishops
People from Tarsus, Mersin